The Canals of Drusus were Roman canals constructed for military purposes by Nero Claudius Drusus around 12 BC. It is believed to have linked the Rhine delta with the Lake Flevo, (today's IJsselmeer). They facilitated troop transport to the north, avoiding the need to cross the open North Sea. This was of strategic importance for attacks on the Germanic people living on the Frisian coasts and along the Elbe estuary in the German Bight. Drusus' son Germanicus used the canals dug by his father's army in a military campaign some decades later. The canals are mentioned by Roman historians who lived two centuries later. One of them is Suetonius who is referring to it in his VITA DIVI CLAUDI 

The exact location of the canals are unknown and it is the subject of debate by modern historians, archaeologists and geologists. It may have been located inland along the valley of the river IJssel (not yet a distributary of the Rhine branch in Roman times). Alternatively it may have been closer to the coast in the lagoon area north of Utrecht (one of many Roman border posts) connecting lagoon lakes and local branches of the Rhine delta. 

Another possibility is the Lange Renne just over the border in Germany. It connects two slings of the Rhine and has all characteristics of a canal dug including a 10 meter deep hole in the canal bed where once one of two dams was removed, obviously created by the sudden influx of the water. And a dam on the other side of the canal that is not entirely removed.

See also
 List of Roman canals

References

External links 
 Entry at livius.org
 Entry at cultuurwijzer.nl 
 German Wikipedia for Lange Renne
 Die Lange Renne  
 SVETONI TRANQVILII VITA DIVI CLAVDI

Canals in the Netherlands
Canals in Germany
Roman canals
Nero Claudius Drusus